S17 may refer to:

Aviation 
 Rans S-17 Stinger, an American ultralight aircraft
 Saab 17, a Swedish reconnaissance aircraft
 Short S.17 Kent, a British flying boat airliner
 SIAI S.17, an Italian racing flying boat
 Sikorsky S-17, a Russian biplane
 Twin Lakes Airport (South Carolina), in Aiken County, South Carolina, United States

Rail and transit 
 Funabori Station, in Edogawa, Tokyo, Japan
 Gorō Station, in Ōzu, Ehime Prefecture, Japan
 Nippombashi Station, in Chūō-ku, Osaka, Japan
 Nonami Station, in Tempaku-ku, Nagoya, Aichi Prefecture, Japan
 Ranshima Station, in Otaru, Hokkaido, Japan
 Wohlen–Dietikon railway line, of the Zürich S-Bahn

Roads 
 S17 Baicheng Ring Expressway, China
 Expressway S17 (Poland)
 County Route S17 (California), United States

Vessels 
 
 , a submarine of the Royal Navy
 , a torpedo boat of the Imperial German Navy
 , a submarine of the United States Navy

Other uses 
 40S ribosomal protein S17
 British NVC community S17, a swamps and tall-herb fens community in the British National Vegetation Classification system
 S17: Keep away from combustible material, a safety phrase
 S17, a postcode district in Sheffield, England